Mannheimer Heinrich-Vetter-Literaturpreis is a literary prize of the Rhine-Neckar Metropolitan Region in Germany.

German literary awards
Literary awards of Hesse